The 458th Parachute Field Artillery Battalion (458th PFAB) is an inactive airborne field artillery battalion of the United States Army. Active with the 13th Airborne Division from 1943–1946, the battalion deployed to France but never saw combat.

Lineage 
Constituted 26 December 1942 in the Army of the United States as the 458th Parachute Field Artillery Battalion and assigned to the 13th Airborne Division
Activated 20 February 1943 at Fort Bragg, North Carolina
Inactivated 25 February 1946 at Fort Bragg, North Carolina

Campaign Participation Credit 
World War II:  Central Europe

See also
13th Airborne Division
13th Airborne Division Artillery

References

Field Artillery US 458
Parachute US 458
Airborne artillery units and formations